The R362 road is a regional road in Ireland linking Dunmore on the N83 (via 5 km of the R360) with the M6 at Athlone. It passes through Glenamaddy, Creggs, Athleague and Curraghboy en route.

See also
Roads in Ireland
National primary road
National secondary road

References
Roads Act 1993 (Classification of Regional Roads) Order 2006 – Department of Transport

Regional roads in the Republic of Ireland
Roads in County Roscommon
Roads in County Galway